Violence Begets Violence is the seventh studio album by underground Philadelphia hip hop duo Jedi Mind Tricks. This is their only album to not feature production from Stoupe the Enemy of Mankind because "his heart wasn't into making JMT records anymore" as well as the fact that both Vinnie Paz and Jus Allah grew tired of waiting. Two singles were released, "Target Practice" and "When Crows Descend Upon You," for which a video has been made. In addition, Shuko remixed the song "Target Practice".

Reception
This album received mixed and often polarized reviews. XXL Magazine gave the album an L, saying that despite Stoupe's absence on the production, "not even the occasional curve ball (like the reggae-inflected “Chalice”) can harness Paz’s Mephistophelean fervor." HipHopDX noted in a 3/5 review that "the rage filled rants can become monotonous as the album wears on, but some longtime fans will be satisfied with the angst-fueled vocals." Other critics were not so kind. Matthew Cole, writing for Slant Magazine, derided the disc's production in a 0.5/5 write-up, saying "a crew of guest producers step in to stuff the album with sub-Luger trunk rattlers and RZA knock-offs that are a lot less spooky than their portentous titles would suggest." The album earned 66 out of 100 from review aggregator Metacritic based on 5 reviews.

Sales
The album debuted at #92 on Billboard 200 being the groups best chart performance earning their first ever top 100 spot, selling 4,400 copies in the first week. As of January 1, 2012 the album has sold 10,652 copies in the US.

Track listing

Charts

References

External links
Violence Begets Violence at The Source

2011 albums
Jedi Mind Tricks albums